List of all counties in South Korea: There are 82 counties in South Korea since Cheongwon County was dissolved on July 1, 2014 and consolidated by Cheongju.

Dissolved counties 

1946
 Cheongju County
 Chuncheon County
 Yeongpyeong County
1949
 Yeosu County
1952
 Gangneung County
 Gyeongju County
 Wonju County
1956
 Chungju County
1963
 Cheongan County
1973
 Bucheong County
 Dongrae County
1980
 Jecheong County
1988
 Gwangsan County
1989
 Chunseong County
 Daedeok County
 Siheung County
 Wolseong County
 Wonseong County
1992
 Goyang County
1995
 Asan County
 Boryeong County
 Changwon County
 Cheonan County
 Chuncheon County
 Geoje County
 Geumreung County
 Gimhae County
 Gimje County
 Gongju County
 Gwangyang County
 Gyeongju County
 Gyeongsan County
 Iksan County
 Jecheon County
 Jeongeup County
 Jinyang County annexed by Jinju
 Jungwon County annexed by Chungju
 Miryang County
 Mungyeong County
 Myeongju County annexed by Gangneung
 Naju County
 Namwon County
 Namyangju County
 Okgu County annexed by Gunsan
 Pyeongtaek County
 Sacheon County
 Samcheok County
 Sangju County
 Seonsan County annexed by Gumi
 Seosan County
 Seungju County annexed by Suncheon
 Tongyeong County
 Uichang County
 Wonju County
 Yeongcheon County
 Yeongil County annexed by Pohang
 Yeongpung County annexed by Yeongju
1996
 Icheon County
 Nonsan County
 Paju County
 Yangsan County
 Yongin County
1998
 Anseong County
 Gimpo County
 Yeocheon County annexed by Yeosu
2001
 Gwangju County
 Hwaseong County
2003
 Pocheon County
 Yangju County
2006
 Bukjeju County annexed by Jeju
 Namjeju County annexed by Seogwipo
2011
 Dangjin County
2012
 Yeongi County annexed by Sejong
2013
 Yeoju County upgraded into a city
2014
 Cheongwon County annexed by Cheongju

See also
 List of cities in South Korea

References

 

Counties